The Kenzaburō Ōe Prize (大江健三郎賞) was a Japanese literary award sponsored by Kodansha (講談社) and established in 2006 to commemorate both the 100th anniversary of Kodansha's establishment and 50th anniversary of the writing life of Kenzaburō Ōe (大江健三郎). The award was for Japanese literary novels published in the previous year, with the winning work selected solely by Ōe. The winner received no cash award, but several winning works were translated into other languages, such as English, French and German, for publication. Kenzaburō Ōe had an open conversation with each winner. The final prize was awarded in 2014, and the collected selection commentary and dialogues were reprinted in a single volume published by Kodansha in 2018.

List of winners

References

2006 establishments in Japan
Japanese literary awards
Awards established in 2006